Last Parade may refer to:

 "Last Parade" (song), a 2009 song  by Matthew Good
 Last Parade (album), an album by Call Me No One
 The Last Parade (film), 1931 American crime film